The pasilla chile or chile negro is the dried form of the chilaca chili pepper, a long and narrow member of species Capsicum annuum. Named for its dark, wrinkled skin (literally "little raisin"), it is a mild to hot, rich-flavored chile.

It turns from dark green to dark brown when fully mature.

In the United States, producers and grocers sometimes incorrectly use "pasilla" to describe the poblano, a different, wider variety of pepper, the dried form of which is called an ancho.

Use
Pasilla are used especially in sauces. They are often combined with fruits and are excellent served with duck, seafood, lamb, mushrooms, garlic, fennel, honey, or oregano. They are sold whole or powdered in Mexico, the United States, and the United Kingdom.

Pasilla de Oaxaca is a variety of smoked pasilla chile from Oaxaca used in mole negro.

See also
 Chipotle - The smoked and dried form of the jalapeño chili pepper.
 Guajillo - The dried form of the mirasol chili pepper.
 List of Capsicum cultivars

References

Further reading
 Kennedy, Diana. The Cuisines of Mexico (revised edition) New York: Harper & Row, 1986.
 Kennedy, Diana. From My Mexican Kitchen: Techniques and Ingredients. New York: Clarkson Potter/Publishers, 2003.
 McMahan, Jacqueline Higuera. Red & Green Chile Cookbook. Lake Hughes, CA: The Olive Press, 1992.

Chili peppers
Capsicum cultivars